Hofstadter is a surname. Notable people with the surname include:

 Albert Hofstadter (1910–1989), American philosopher
 Douglas Hofstadter (born 1945), American professor, author of Gödel, Escher, Bach
 Richard Hofstadter (1916–1970), American historian
 Robert Hofstadter (1915–1990), American Nobel Prize-winner in physics
 Samuel H. Hofstadter (1894–1970), New York politician and judge

Fictional characters:
 Beverly Hofstadter, a character in the television series The Big Bang Theory, mother of Leonard
 Leonard Hofstadter, a character in the television series The Big Bang Theory
 Penny Hofstadter, a character in the television series The Big Bang Theory, wife of Leonard

See also
 Hofstadter's butterfly, a fractal
 Hofstadter Committee, a joint legislative investigating committee in New York 1931–1932
 Hofstadter's law, "It always takes longer than you expect ..."
 Hofstadter-Moebius loop, a condition that affected HAL 9000, a fictional computer
 Hofstadter points, in triangle geometry
 Hofstadter sequence, an integer sequence

Jewish surnames